Maksić is a Serbian surname. Notable people with the surname include:

Dejan Maksić (born 1975), Serbian footballer
Milivoje Maksić (1928–2003), Yugoslav diplomat, politician, and author
Nenad Maksić (born 1972), Serbian handball coach and player

Serbian surnames